is the 11th single by Japanese entertainer Miho Nakayama. Written and produced by Toshiki Kadomatsu, the single was released on October 7, 1987, by King Records. A remix of the song by DJ Night Tempo was released on streaming media on June 18, 2021.

Background and release
"Catch Me" was used as the opening theme of the Fuji TV drama series , which starred Nakayama.

"Catch Me" became Nakayama's first No. 1 on Oricon's weekly singles chart and sold over 218,000 copies.

Track listing

Charts
Weekly charts

Year-end charts

References

External links

1987 singles
1987 songs
Japanese-language songs
Japanese television drama theme songs
Miho Nakayama songs
Songs written by Toshiki Kadomatsu
King Records (Japan) singles
Oricon Weekly number-one singles